Mexico's  National Center for Prevention of Disasters (Centro Nacional de Prevención de Desastres, or CENAPRED) is a federal agency, attached to the Secretariat of the Interior. Based in Mexico City, its function is to alert residents of possible disasters, such as volcanic eruptions.

It was created in 1988, as part of the steps taken to improve disaster prevention and management in the aftermath of the 19 September 1985 earthquake.

External links

CENAPRED 

Government agencies of Mexico
Disaster preparedness